The Medical Relief Disqualification Removal Act 1885 (48 & 49 Vict. c. 46) was an Act of the Parliament of the United Kingdom. It became law on 6 August 1885.

It provided that any person who had received medical or surgical treatment, for themselves or their family, paid for under the poor laws, was no longer disqualified from voting in parliamentary or municipal elections. The disqualification remained, however, with regards to voting for a member of a parochial board or any other body which governed poor relief.

The removal of the disqualification was to be considered as having been effective from 15 July 1884.

As to the meaning of "medical relief", see Kirkhouse v Blakeway.

The whole Act, so far as unrepealed, was repealed by section 47(1) of, and the Eighth Schedule to, the Representation of the People Act 1918.

References
W Paterson (ed). "Medical Relief Disqualification Removal Act, 1885". The Practical Statutes of the Session 1885. Horace Cox. London. 1885. Pages 231 to 234.
J M Lely. "Medical Relief Disqualification Removal Act, 1885". Statutes of Practical Utility. (Chitty's Statutes). Fifth Edition. Sweet and Maxwell. Stevens and Sons. Chancery Lane, London. 1895. Volume 8. Title "Parliament". Pages 305 to 306.
"The Medical Relief Disqualification Removal Act, 1885". Chitty's Statutes of Practical Utility. Sixth Edition. Sweet and Maxwell. 1912. Volume 9. Page 542.
Miles Walker Mattinson. The Franchise Acts 1884-5, being the Representation of the People Act, 1884; Registration Act, 1885; Parliamentary Elections (Redistribution) Act, 1885, and Medical Relief Disqualification Removal Act, 1885, with Introduction and Notes. London. 1885. Catalogue. Review at "Nine Law Books" (1885) 60 The Saturday Review 616 (7 November 1885)
J M Lely and W D I Foulkes. "48 & 49 Vict c 46". The Parliamentary Election Acts for England and Wales. William Clowes and Sons. Fleet Street, London. 1885. Pages 73 to 73b.
John James Heath Saint. "Medical Relief Disqualification Removal Act, 1885". Voters and Their Registration. Butterworths. Fleet Street, London. 1885. Pages 274 to 278.
John James Heath Saint. A Digest of Parliamentary and Municipal Registration Cases. Second Edition. Butterworths. Fleet Street, London. 1887. Pages 394 and 395.
Emden and Thompson [1887] The Complete Annual Digest of every Reported Case in all the Courts. Title "Parliament". Paragraph 10 at column 258.
Brian Rodgers, "The Medical Relief (Disqualification Removal) Act, 1885: A Storm in a Political Teacup " [1955–1956] 9 Parliamentary Affairs 188 to 194 (No 2, Spring 1956). OUP.
Oliver & Boyd's new Edinburgh almanac and national repository for the year 1886. Oliver & Boyd, Edinburgh, 1886
"Medical Relief Disqualification Removal". Companion to the Almanac; or, Year-Book of General Information for 1886. Page 249.

United Kingdom Acts of Parliament 1885
1885 in British law
Poor Law in Britain and Ireland